Hazem Emam (born 17 April 1975) is an Egyptian member of parliament. He is a member in House of Representatives and board member of Egyptian Football Association. Emam was a retired professional footballer who played as an attacking midfielder.

Early life
Hazem was born in Mohandessin, Egypt. He is the son of the Zamalek legend, Hamada Emam; and the grandson of another Zamalek legend, Yehia Emam. Hazem as a kid, never planned to become a footballer and follow the footsteps of his father and grandfather. He always focused on one thing at a time, and in his early teens, he only focused on enjoying his life, hanging out with friends, and just finishing school. Hazem was known to be very shy as a child, and that was mainly why at first he refused to practice football despite his father's insistence.

Club career
Hazem loved to play football for fun. He never wanted to take things seriously, and that's why he went to practice at El Said club, A club that does not have a first team. He wanted to be with his friends all the time, until one day, in the Egyptian Youth League, Zamalek's youth coach at the time, Badr Haddad, insisted that he has to come and play for Zamalek. Haddad spoke to Hazem's father, Hamada, who was Zamalek's president at the time, and convinced him that his son is a real gem. Hazem went to then play for Zamalek's youth. Until in 1993, when Mahmoud El Gohary took charge of the team, he promoted young Hazem to the first team, and made his debut in November that same year. However, he did not make many appearances that seasons and was mainly used as a late sub. However, next season, he was given an opportunity to shine and was the focus of attention as a potential future star for Egypt. His amazing performances in that season, and the one that followed, convinced Egypt's National Team coach at the time, Ruud Krol to pick him for the national team.

1996 African Cup of Nations arrived, and Emam's form was on fire. He was Egypt's best player in the tournament, and one of the best youngsters to shine. His performance interested Parma, and Udinese. Hazem eventually signed for Udinese. Emam did not enjoy a successful era in the Serie A, despite being the first Egyptian footballer to play in Italy. He never really got his chance, as Alberto Zaccheroni preferred to play him as a striker, despite Hazem's natural position being a playmaker. Hazem could not break into the first team due to the rocking striking partnership between Oliver Bierhoff and Marcio Amoroso, and was eventually loaned to De Graafschap in the Netherlands. There, Emam enjoyed two successful seasons making 38 appearances, and scoring four goals, leading to interest from Ajax.

Despite Ajax's efforts to sign the creative playmaker, he returned to Zamalek in January 2001. His first game was against Zamalek's archrivals, Al Ahly, in which Zamalek won 3-1, with Emam assisting the first goal. He was quickly assigned the team's captain and led them to winning the league that same season scoring 2 goals and making numerous assists. Emam was an instant fan favorite and captained Zamalek to winning 3 league titles, 1 cup title, 2 super cup titles, 1 African cup title, and 1 African super cup title. He enjoyed four successful seasons winning trophies, and individual accolades with Zamalek, before his form started to drop at the start of the 2005–06 season. Hazem was always criticized for his lack of fitness during his career, and after he hit the 30 it was obvious that he was not the same player anymore. Hazem's role at the club declined in his last three seasons, which led to him to retiring at the age of only 33. At the opening match of the 2007–08 season, Emam fell out with Zamalek's supporters after they kept chanting vulgarities towards him and asking him to retire. Emam announced his retirement, only to shortly come back after the fans offered a public apology. However, he finished his career at the end of that season on a high note, after Zamalek beat Enppi in the cup final, marking Zamalek's first trophy in four seasons. Hazem had announced his retirement earlier in spring, therefore the player's wore a T-shirt that had his number on it and words "Don't retire Hazem" in the warm up before the game.

International goals

Honours and achievements

Club
Zamalek
 Egyptian Premier League: 2000–01, 2002–03, 2003–04
 Egypt Cup: 2002, 2008
 Egyptian Super Cup: 2001, 2002
 CAF Champions League: 1996, 2002
 CAF Super Cup: 2003
 Arab Club Champions Cup: 2003
 Saudi-Egyptian Super Cup: 2003

International
Egypt
 African Cup of Nations: 1998
 All-Africa Games: 1995

Individual
 Africa Cup of Nations Dream Team: 1996

External links

Hazem Emam Official Website

References

1975 births
Living people
Egyptian footballers
Egypt international footballers
1999 FIFA Confederations Cup players
Footballers from Cairo
Association football midfielders
Udinese Calcio players
De Graafschap players
Zamalek SC players
Egyptian expatriate footballers
Expatriate footballers in Italy
Expatriate footballers in the Netherlands
Serie A players
Eredivisie players
1996 African Cup of Nations players
1998 African Cup of Nations players
2000 African Cup of Nations players
2002 African Cup of Nations players
2004 African Cup of Nations players
Egyptian expatriate sportspeople in Italy
Egyptian Premier League players
Emam family